Dunhuang Yardang National Geopark, officially Dunhuang UNESCO National Geopark (China), is a UNESCO national geopark in Dunhuang, Gansu Province, China, that shows the Yardang geological feature of the area. Fully certified, the park must also be a member of the regional network, in this case the Asia Pacific Geoparks Network and the Global Geopark Network. Yardangs, the chief feature of geologic interest, were created over time by the soft part of the earth's surface being eroded by wind and rain, with the hard part of the rocks remaining in the desert.

The geopark is located about 180 kilometers northwest of Dunhuang's town center and covers an area of 398 square kilometers.  Some of the uniquely shaped rocks in the geopark are named "Mongolian Bao", "Camel", "Stone Bird", "Peacock", "The Golden Lion Welcoming His Guests", etc.

The unique rock formations in the park developed over a period of 700,000 years. The Yardang geomorphic formations found in the Dunhuang Yadan National Geopark are the largest in China.

One of the most remarkable sites in the Dunhuang Yadan National Geopark is the Yardang Ghost Town. Located within the Ghost Town is the Aisikexiaer Castle. The word 'Aisikexiaer' means 'old city' in the Uyghur language.

Gallery

See also
 National Geoparks of China

References

External links

National parks of China
Dunhuang